Anisul Haque Chowdhury may refer to:
 Anisul Haque Chowdhury (Rangpur politician), Bangladeshi politician and member of parliament for Rangpur-7 and Rangpur-2.
 Anisul Haque Chowdhury (Dinajpur politician), Bangladeshi politician and member of parliament for Dinajpur-1